Indiana University Bloomington (IU Bloomington, Indiana University, IU, or simply Indiana) is a public research university in Bloomington, Indiana. It is the flagship campus of Indiana University and, with over 40,000 students, its largest campus.

Indiana University is a member of the Association of American Universities and is classified among "R1: Doctoral Universities – Very high research activity". It has numerous schools and programs, including: the Jacobs School of Music;  the Luddy School of Informatics, Computing, and Engineering;   the O'Neill School of Public and Environmental Affairs;  the Kelley School of Business;  the School of Public Health;  the School of Nursing;  the School of Optometry;   the Maurer School of Law;  the School of Education;  the Media School; and the Hamilton Lugar School of Global and International Studies.

The university is home to an extensive student life program, with more than 750 student organizations on campus and with around 17 percent of undergraduates joining the Greek system. Indiana athletic teams compete in Division I of the NCAA and are known as the Indiana Hoosiers. The university is a member of the Big Ten Conference. Since it does not have a mascot, all teams are known simply as "Hoosiers."

Indiana's faculty, staff, and alumni include nine Nobel laureates, 19 Rhodes Scholars, 17 Marshall Scholars, and five MacArthur Fellows. In addition, students and alumni have won six Academy Awards, 49 Grammy Awards, 32 Emmy Awards, 20 Pulitzer Prizes, four Tony Awards, and 95 Olympic medals (51 gold, 21 silver, and 23 bronze).

History

Early years
Indiana's state government in Corydon established Indiana University on January 20, 1820, as the "State Seminary." Construction began in 1822 at what is now called Seminary Square Park near the intersection of Second Street and College Avenue. Classes began on April 4, 1825. The first professor was Baynard Rush Hall, a Presbyterian minister who taught all of the classes in 1825–27. In the first year, he taught twelve students and was paid $250. Hall was a classicist who focused on Greek and Latin and believed that the study of classical philosophy and languages formed the basis of the best education. The first class graduated in 1830. From 1820 to 1889 a legal-political battle was fought between IU and Vincennes University as to which was the legitimate state university.

In 1829, Andrew Wylie became the first president, serving until his death in 1851. The school's name was changed to "Indiana College" in 1829, and to "Indiana University" in 1838. Wylie and David Maxwell, president of the board of trustees, were devout Presbyterians. They spoke of the nonsectarian status of the school but generally hired fellow Presbyterians. Presidents and professors were expected to set a moral example for their charges. After six ministers in a row, the first non-clergyman to become president was the young biology professor David Starr Jordan, in 1885. Jordan followed Baptist theologian Lemuel Moss, who resigned after a scandal broke regarding his involvement with a female professor.

Jordan (president 1884–1891) improved the university's finances and public image, doubled its enrollment, and instituted an elective system along the lines of his alma mater, Cornell University. Jordan became president of Stanford University in June 1891.

The growth of the institution was slow. In 1851, IU had nearly a hundred students and seven professors. IU admitted its first woman student, Sarah Parke Morrison, in 1867, making IU the fourth public university to admit women on an equal basis with men. Morrison went on to become the first female professor at IU in 1873. 

Mathematician Joseph Swain was IU's first Hoosier-born president, 1893 to 1902. He established Kirkwood Hall in 1894; a gymnasium for men in 1896, which later was named Assembly Hall; and Kirkwood Observatory in 1900. He began construction for Science Hall in 1901. During his presidency, student enrollment increased from 524 to 1,285.

In 1883, IU awarded its first PhD and played its first intercollegiate sport (baseball), prefiguring the school's future status as a major research institution and a power in collegiate athletics. But another incident that year was of more immediate concern: the original campus in Seminary Square burned to the ground. The college was rebuilt between 1884 and 1908 at the far eastern edge of Bloomington. (Today, the city has expanded eastward, and the "new" campus is once again in the midst of the city.) One challenge was that Bloomington's limited water supply was inadequate for its population of 12,000 and could not handle university expansion. The university commissioned a study that led to building a reservoir for its use.

20th century 
In 1902, IU enrolled 1203 undergraduates; all but 65 were Hoosiers. There were 82 graduate students including ten from out-of-state. The curriculum emphasized the classics, as befitted a gentleman, and stood in contrast to the service-oriented curriculum at Purdue, which presented itself as of direct benefit to farmers, industrialists, and businessmen.

The first extension office of IU was opened in Indianapolis in 1916. In 1920/1921 the School of Music and the School of Commerce and Finance (what later became the Kelley School of Business) were opened. In the 1940s Indiana University opened extension campuses in Kokomo and Fort Wayne. The controversial Kinsey Institute for sexual research was established in 1945.

During the Great Depression, Indiana University fared much better than most state schools thanks to the entrepreneurship of its young president Herman Wells. He collaborated with Frederick L. Hovde, the president of IU's cross-state rival, Purdue; together they approached the Indiana delegation to Congress, indicating their highest priorities. For Wells, it was to build a world-class music school, replacing dilapidated facilities. As a result of these efforts, the Works Progress Administration (WPA) built one of the finest facilities in the country. He added matching funds from the state legislature and opened a full-scale fund-raising campaign among alumni and the business community. In 1942, Wells reported that "The past five years have been the greatest single period of expansion in the physical plant of the University in its entire history. In this period 15 new buildings have been constructed.

In 1960, the IU student body elected Thomas Atkins, an African-American from Elkhart, Indiana, to the position of president of the student body. A throng of white students protested the result by parading around campus waving Confederate flags and allegedly blamed Atkins' victory on a "bunch of beatniks." When the protesters approached the female dormitory on campus, they were met with "a barrage of cosmetic bottles, old shoes, and other objects."

Campus
The Indiana University Bloomington campus of  includes abundant green space and historic buildings dating to the university's reconstruction in the late nineteenth century. The campus rests on a bed of Indiana Limestone, specifically Salem Limestone and Harrodsburg Limestone, with outcroppings of St. Louis Limestone.

The "Campus River" is a stream flowing through the center of campus. A section of Bloomington's Clear Creek, it was formerly named after David Starr Jordan, Darwinist, ichthyologist, and president of IU, later, of Stanford University., but the name was changed in 2020 due to Jordan's support of eugenics becoming widely known.

Bloomington was ranked 5th best city for educated millennials by Business Insider. College Ranker listed Bloomington as #6 Best College Town to Live in Forever.

Facilities and architecture 

Many of the campus's buildings, especially the older central buildings, are made from Indiana Limestone quarried locally. The Works Progress Administration built much of the campus's core during the Great Depression. Many of the campus's buildings were built and most of its land acquired during the 1950s and 1960s when first soldiers attending under the GI Bill and then the baby boom swelled the university's enrollment from 5,403 in 1940 to 30,368 in 1970. Some buildings on campus underwent similar expansion. As additions were constructed by building onto the outside of existing buildings, exterior surfaces were incorporated into their new interiors, making this expansion visible in the affected buildings' architecture. The Chemistry and Biology buildings serve as examples, where two of the interior walls of the latter's library were clearly constructed as limestone exteriors. The Bryan House is the traditional on-campus home of the university president.

Nine of the oldest buildings are included in a national historic district known as The Old Crescent. It was listed on the National Register of Historic Places in 1980. They are the Collegiate Gothic style Student Service Building (1906–1908); Indiana University Museum (1905); Richardsonian Romanesque style Maxwell Building (1890, 1907–1908); Owen Hall (1885); Wylie Hall (1885); Kirkwood Hall (1895); Lindley Hall (1903); Gothic Revival style Rose Well House (1908); and Kirkwood Observatory (1900).

The Sample Gates serve as the entryway to Indiana University's campus and The Old Crescent. It is positioned between Franklin Hall and Bryan Hall. After several failed attempts to create an arched entrance to campus, in 1987, Edson Sample provided funding to build the archway based on the 1961 design proposed by Eggers & Higgins.

The Indiana University Cinema opened in January 2011 in the former University Theatre building, which was built in the 1930s.

The Bloomington campus also has a biology research greenhouse in the Biology Building that is open to the public, one of the highlights of which is a corpse flower (Amorphophallus titanum) named Wally. Also on campus, the Kirkwood Observatory is open to the public one day a week.

The 1979 movie Breaking Away was filmed on location in Bloomington and the IU campus. It also featured a reenactment of the annual Little 500 bicycle race. The IU campus also has trails that many utilize for biking and running.

Indiana Memorial Union

The over  Indiana Memorial Union (IMU) is the second-largest student union in the world. In addition to stores and restaurants, it features an eight-story student activities tower (home to the Indiana University Student Association, Indiana Memorial Union Board, and a variety of other student organizations), a 186-room hotel, a 400-seat theatre, a  Alumni Hall,  of meeting space, and a bowling alley. The IMU houses an outstanding collection of Indiana art including artists from Brown County, the Hoosier Group, Richmond Group and others. This collection is the largest public collection of art outside of a museum.

Athletic facilities

Indiana University's athletic facilities are located on campus and are grouped in between East 17th Street, Dunn Street and the IN-45/IN-46 bypass. In the 17,000-seat Assembly Hall (home to the IU NCAA basketball team), there are five NCAA Men's Division I Basketball Championship banners on display. Cook Hall, Memorial Stadium, Mellencamp Pavilion, the Gladstein Fieldhouse, the IU Tennis Center, the Billy Hayes Track and Bill Armstrong Stadium are all also located within the complex.

Indiana University Auditorium
Indiana University Auditorium (IU Auditorium), is a 3,200 seat performing arts venue located at Indiana University in Bloomington, Indiana. It is situated in IU's Fine Arts Plaza alongside the Lilly Library and the Eskenazi School of Art, Architecture + Design.

Construction on IU Auditorium began in 1939 as a part of the Federal Works Agency Projects. IU Auditorium officially opened its doors March 22, 1941.

IU Auditorium's Hall of Murals is the home of the Indiana Murals, created by American artist Thomas Hart Benton. 16 of the 22 total panels created are housed at the auditorium.

Today, IU Auditorium presents Broadway touring acts, popular musical artists, comedians, classical musicians and more.

Department of Chemistry

The Chemistry Department has had a history at Indiana University since the early days of the institution. Chemistry courses were first added to the curriculum in 1829 by Andrew Wylie, IU president at the time (1829–1851). The first degrees in chemistry were awarded in 1890. The graduate school at Indiana University was not formally established until 1904 but not soon after, a plan for graduate work in chemistry was underway. However, the first PhD in chemistry was not granted until 1921. 
In 1931, the construction of a new facility explicitly for chemistry began which led to major growth within the department. Some of the department's most acclaimed and prolific faculty came to the university during this time.  
A major staple to the department is the famous Sweetheart tree  that has stood outside the Chemistry Building since it was built in 1931. Even when a major addition to the building was made in the 1980s, architects decided to preserve the beloved tree and build around it. In the spring of 2018 the university announced the famous sweetheart tree was dying, and removal was scheduled to begin on April 11.

Libraries

The Indiana University Bloomington Library System supports over twenty libraries and provides access to more than 9.9 million books, 800 databases, 60,000 electronic journal titles, and 815,000 ebooks. The system is the 14th largest library in North America by volumes held.

Herman B Wells Library
IU's Herman B Wells Library holds more than 4.6 million volumes. Before a ceremony in June 2005, when it was renamed for IU's former president and chancellor, this building was simply called the Main Library. The architectural firm Eggers & Higgins designed the largely windowless, limestone paneled library, whose construction began in 1966 and was completed in 1969. The building contains eleven floors in the East Tower (research collection) and five floors in the West Tower (the undergraduate core collection). In 2014 the first floors of both towers were renovated and reintroduced as the Learning Commons and Scholars' Commons. The library is also home to Indiana University Press and the University Graduate School. It is the former home of the Information and Library Science Department, which is now hosted by Luddy Hall.

An oft-repeated urban legend holds that the library is sinking because when it was built, engineers failed to take into account the weight of all the books that would occupy the building. An article in the Indiana Daily Student newspaper debunks this myth, stating, among other things, that the building rests on a 94 ft (28.6 m) thick limestone bedrock.

Branch libraries
In addition to IU's main library, the Bloomington Libraries support more than twenty additional libraries:
 Archives of African American Music & Culture
 Archives of Traditional Music
 Black Film Center/Archive
 Business/SPEA Information Commons (Library for the Kelley School of Business and the O'Neill School of Public and Environmental Affairs)
 The Science Library
 Education Library, located within the Wendell E. Wright School of Education
 LGBTQ+ Library
 Indiana Institute on Disability and Community, Center for Disability Information and Referral (CeDIR) Library
 Indiana Prevention Resource Center Library
 Indiana University Libraries Moving Image Archive (IULMIA)
 Kinsey Institute Library
 Jerome Hall Law Library (Library for the Maurer School of Law)
 Life Sciences Library (Library for the Biology Department, Medical Sciences Program, and Nursing Program)
 Lilly Library (rare books and manuscripts)
 Neal-Marshall Black Culture Center Library
 Optometry Library
 Ostrom Workshop Library
 Residential Programs and Services Libraries
 Sinor Research Institute for Inner Asian Studies
 University Archives and Records Management
 William & Gayle Cook Music Library
 Wylie House Museum

Black Film Center/Archive
The Black Film Center/Archive (BFC/A), located at Indiana University, was "established in 1981 as a repository of films and related materials by and about African Americans." Professor Phyllis R. Klotman founded the repository when it became apparent that rare and valuable films created by and about African Americans were being lost due to lack of preservation and inadequate resources.

The BFC/A has an extensive collection that includes films on various physical media, posters of numerous sizes for films distributed throughout the world, photographs and film stills, and manuscripts of filmmakers and scholars. Although the materials are not available for circulation or distribution, the archive has rooms for viewing films and utilizing materials.

Indiana University Libraries Moving Image Archive 
The Indiana University Libraries Moving Image Archive (IULMIA) is one of the largest repositories for educational film and video in the United States. Founded in 2009, IULMIA contains over 100,000 items spanning over 80 years of audiovisual history. Highlights of its holdings include a collection of over 200 film cameras and projectors, more than 80,000 commercials from the Clio Awards, and approximately 50,000 educational films that Indiana University circulated to classrooms nationwide during the 20th century.

In 2012, the Moving Image Archive was accepted as a member of the International Federation of Film Archives.

Lilly Library

The Lilly Library is one of the largest rare book and manuscript libraries in the United States.  Founded in 1960 with the collection of Josiah K. Lilly, Jr., of Eli Lilly and Company in Indianapolis, the library now contains approximately 400,000 rare books, 6.5 million manuscripts, and 100,000 pieces of sheet music. The library's holdings are particularly strong in British and American history and literature, religious texts, Latin Americana, medicine and science, food and drink, children's literature, fine printing and binding, popular music, medieval and Renaissance manuscripts, and early printing. Notable items in the library's collections include the New Testament of the Gutenberg Bible, a first edition copy of the Book of Mormon, the first printed collection of Shakespeare's works, a pair of the Spock's ears worn by Leonard Nimoy in Star Trek VI: The Undiscovered Country, Audubon's Birds of America, one of 25 extant copies of the "First Printing of the Declaration of Independence" (also known as the "Dunlap Broadside") that was printed in Philadelphia on July 4, 1776, George Washington's letter accepting the presidency of the United States, Abraham Lincoln's desk from his law office, a leaf from the famous, Abraham Lincoln "Sum Book" c. 1824–1826, Lord Chesterfield's letters to his son, the manuscripts of Robert Burns's "Auld Lang Syne", the Boxer Codex, annotated production scripts for Star Trek, J. M. Synge's The Playboy of the Western World, and J. M. Barrie's Peter Pan, and typescripts of many of Ian Fleming's James Bond novels. The library also owns the papers of Hollywood directors Orson Welles and John Ford, the poets Sylvia Plath and Ezra Pound, and authors Edith Wharton, Max Eastman and Upton Sinclair. The library is also home to four Academy Awards, donated by alumni. In 2006, the library received a collection of 30,000 mechanical puzzles from Jerry Slocum. The collection will be on permanent display. Special permission is not required to use the collections, and the library has several exhibition galleries that are open to the public.

Within the Lilly Library is the Ruth E. Adomeit collection of miniature books, one of the world's largest. Among the collection are rare miniature books such as "From Morn Till Eve", a miniature book that presents biblical quotations in a devotional form, with one phrase for each morning and evening of a month. The Online Computer Library Center (OCLC) had listed that, "the only known copy as being in the collection of famed miniature book collector Ruth E. Adomeit", which is now in the Lilly Library.

Fine Arts Library
IU's first Fine Arts Library was established in the late 1930s as part of the Departmental office on the second floor, east wing of the University Library which was then in Franklin Hall. In 1941, two important events occurred: art historian Henry Radford Hope became chairman of the Fine Arts Department in the Fall and the Fine Arts Center was created by remodeling Mitchell Hall Annex. The Fine Arts Library moved into IU Art Museum designed by I.M. Pei in August 1981. This location was closed for renovations to the museum in spring 2017. Most fine arts materials are currently located on the 9th floor of the Herman B Wells Library with the remaining items being located towards the back of the 10th floor.

William and Gayle Cook Music Library
The William and Gayle Cook Music Library, recognized as one of the largest academic music libraries in the world, serves the Jacobs School of Music and the Bloomington Campus of Indiana University.  It occupies a four-floor, 55,000 square-foot facility in a wing of the Bess Meshulam Simon Music Library and Recital Center, dedicated in November 1995. The collection comprises over 700,000 cataloged items on 56,733 linear feet of shelves.

The Cook Music Library holds many special collections, including audio and print collections. One notable collection contains items from Leonard Bernstein's compositional studio, including items such as clothing, furniture, recordings, books, and awards.

Residential Programs and Services Libraries
Residence Hall Library programs began in the 1930s at Harvard University. By 1978, there were twenty-one institutions with residential library systems. Today, Indiana University has only one of two residential library programs that still operates. Additionally, Indiana University has continued to expand its residential library system, adding the most recent branch in 2017. There are currently fourteen library branches: Briscoe, Campus View Apartments, Collins LLC, Eigenmann, Forest, Foster, McNutt, Read, Spruce, Teter, Union Street Center, Wells Quad, Wilkie, and Wright. The libraries are open daily while classes are in session. Previously, half of the branches only offered DVDs and CDs. In 2018, the decision was made to have all library branches offer books in addition to movies and games. The libraries hire graduate students in Indiana University's Master of Library Science program to act as Center Supervisors, who lead a staff of seven student assistants in staffing the libraries each evening. New material is added to the libraries each week, and any student or staff member of Indiana University can check out material using their Crimson Card.

Museums

Sidney and Lois Eskenazi Museum of Art

The Sidney and Lois Eskenazi Museum of Art, formerly known as the Indiana University Art Museum, was established in 1941 and has occupied a building designed by the world-renowned architecture firm I.M. Pei and Partners since 1982. The museum houses a collection of over 40,000 objects and includes works by Claude Monet, Marcel Duchamp, Pablo Picasso, Henri Matisse, and Jackson Pollock. The museum has particular strengths in the art of Africa, Oceania, the Americas, Ancient Greece and Rome, and European Modernism. It also holds a substantial collection of works on paper (prints, drawings, and photographs). The museum routinely has been ranked among the best university art museums in the United States.

Museum of Archaeology and Anthropology
The IU Museum of Archaeology and Anthropology (formerly the Mathers Museum of World Cultures and the Glenn A. Black Laboratory of Archaeology) consist of an estimated 5 million archaeological artifacts, 30,000 ethnographic objects, 20,000 photographs, and supporting library and archive. The collections represent cultures from each of the world's inhabited continents. These materials have been collected and curated to serve the museum's primary mission as a teaching museum within a university setting. The ethnology collections' strengths include traditional musical instruments, photographs of Native Americans and the Bloomington community, Inupiaq and Yupik Eskimo materials, and Pawnee material culture, among others. The archaeology collections piece together the material remains of cultures from the earliest occupations of North American through to the modern period.

Grunwald Gallery of Art
The Grunwald Gallery of Art, a contemporary art museum hosted by the university. The gallery was established in 1983 as the School of Fina Arts Gallery (SoFA Gallery) in what was formerly University's art museum space when that museum relocated to a new building. The museum exhibits experimental works by emerging and established artists as well as works by faculty and students within the Department of Studio Art. It is located at 1201 East 7th Street. It was named in honor of Indiana University alumnus John A. Grunwald in 2011. He was born in Hungary in 1935, survived the Holocaust, emigrated to the United States in 1950, and graduated with a degree in economics in 1956 from Indiana University where he met his wife Rita. In 2017, the art museum hosted an exhibition on the history of tattoo artistry in Indiana.

Indiana Memorial Union 
The Indiana Memorial Union, in addition to hosting many events, holds the largest public collection of art outside a museum. The artwork within the building ranges from priceless sculptures to paintings.

Academics

Admissions

Undergraduate 

The 2022 annual ranking of U.S. News & World Report categorizes Indiana University Bloomington as "more selective." For the Class of 2025 (enrolled fall 2021), Indiana received 46,548 applications and accepted 39,543 (85.0%). Of those accepted, 9,482 enrolled, a yield rate (the percentage of accepted students who choose to attend the university) of 24.0%. Indiana's freshman retention rate is 90.3%, with 80.9% going on to graduate within six years.

Of the 39% of the incoming freshman class who submitted SAT scores; the middle 50 percent Composite scores were 1170-1370. Of the 23% of enrolled freshmen in 2021 who submitted ACT scores; the middle 50 percent Composite score was between 26 and 32. 

Indiana University Bloomington is a college-sponsor of the National Merit Scholarship Program and sponsored 56 Merit Scholarship awards in 2020. In the 2020–2021 academic year, 68 freshman students were National Merit Scholars.

Rankings and reputation

Indiana University is one of 62 members of the Association of American Universities, an organization of leading North American research universities. It has been called a Public Ivy university.

As of 2022, IU Bloomington's Masters in Public Affairs program is ranked No. 1 in the nation by U.S. News. IU is also ranked No. 1 in Environmental Policy and Management, Nonprofit Management, and Public Finance and Budgeting. The Kelley School of Business at IU, known for being a top-tier business school, was ranked in 2016 as the #1 public undergraduate business program by Bloomberg Businessweek.

The Academic Ranking of World Universities ranked IU Bloomington 101–150 in the world and 49–60 nationally in 2017. Additionally, it ranked Indiana University-Bloomington 16th in the world for Business Administration, 7th in the world for Communication, 5th in the world for Public Administration, and 2nd in the world for Library and Information Science. U.S. News ranks IU 26th out of the top public universities in the United States. Forbes ranks IU 20th out of Public Universities.

Schools and Colleges

The Office of the Provost oversees the academic programs, research, and policies of 16 schools on the Indiana University Bloomington campus.
Together, these units offer more than 550 individual degree programs and majors.

College of Arts and Sciences

The College of Arts and Sciences is the largest of the university's academic divisions and home to more than 40 percent of its undergraduates. Also, the college offers many electives and general education courses for students enrolled in most other schools on campus. There are more than 50 academic departments in the college, encompassing a broad range of disciplines from the traditional (such as anthropology, art, biology, chemistry, classics, English, history, mathematics, philosophy, physics, political science, and psychology) to more modern and specialized areas, including Jewish studies, comparative literature, history and philosophy of science, and international studies. Through the college, IU also offers instruction in over 50 foreign languages, one of the largest language study offerings at any American university. IU is the only university in the nation that offers a degree in Hungarian (although it was done through the Individualized Major Program) and is the first university in the United States to offer a doctorate in Gender Studies. The Department of Geography has highly recognized programs in climate and environmental change, GIS, human-environment interaction, and human geography. Indiana University is also home to the nation's only degree-granting Department of Central Eurasian Studies. The university's catalog at one time boasted that a student could study any language from Akan to Zulu. The college is the parent division for fifteen individual research institutes and is the only academic division within the university to house autonomous schools (The School of Art + Design, The School of Global and International Studies, and the Media School) within it. Several first- and second-year students from the Indiana University School of Medicine (which is based at IUPUI) complete their preclinical education at the Bloomington campus's Medical Science Program, which is housed within the Department of Biology and the Indiana Molecular Biology Institute. The college is also home to the Department of Folklore and Ethnomusicology, the first formally established academic department in folklore at any United States university and the only such department to integrate these two practices into one field. IU also features a world-class cyclotron operated by the Department of Physics. The college also houses IU's Department of Theatre, Drama, and Contemporary Dance which offers a Bachelor of Arts in Theatre, a BFA in Contemporary Dance, a Master of Fine Arts in Acting, Directing, Playwriting or Design/Technology, and a BFA in Musical Theatre. In 2009, a professor of political science (Elinor Ostrom) became the first woman to win the Nobel Prize in Economic Sciences since its inception in 1969.

School of Art, Architecture + Design
The School of Art, Architecture + Design houses fourteen different areas in art, architecture, design, and merchandising.

School of Global and International Studies
The SGIS is an international affairs school composed of over 500 students from four academic departments and twenty-one institutes and centers. It also runs the Indiana University Summer Language Workshop (SWSEEL).

The Media School
The Media School was established on July 1, 2014. Its faculty teaches in areas of Communication science, Cinema and media studies, Media arts and production, and Journalism. Housed in a building named for famed war correspondent and alumnus Ernie Pyle, the School of Journalism was established in 1911. In July 2014 the School of Journalism merged with the newly founded Media School at IU. The Media School offers a BA. in journalism and a Masters of Science degree for those preparing for careers as reporters, editors, broadcasters, public relations professionals, multimedia specialists, and educators. It draws students from as far away as China, Thailand, and Ukraine and as close as Bloomington or other Indiana towns. Among the alumni are more than 30 Pulitzer Prize winners. Alumni work in every field of journalism, from the oldest form of print publishing to the newest form as online journalists. Many remain active in supporting the school by mentoring students, facilitating internship programs, and donating time and financial gifts to the school. Well-known former journalism students include Joe Buck, Dave Niehaus, and Sage Steele, among others.

The Media School is home to the Michael I. Arnolt Center for Investigative Journalism. Student media outlets include 99.1 WIUX Radio, IUSTV, the Indiana Daily Student, the Hoosier Network, WTUI, as well as other groups on campus.

Hutton Honors College

Jacobs School of Music

Founded at the beginning of the 20th century by Charles Campbell, the Jacobs School of Music focuses on voice, opera, orchestral conducting, and jazz studies. It was ranked No. 1 in the country tied with Juilliard and Eastman School of Music by U.S. News & World Report in 2009. U.S. News has not since published a music school ranking. The Hollywood Reporter ranked the Jacobs School of Music #4 in 2016. Music School Central ranked Jacobs #1 in the nation in 2014.

With more than 1,600 students, the school is one of the largest of its kind in the US and among the largest in the world. The school's facilities, including five buildings in the heart of campus, comprise recital halls, more than 170 practice rooms, choral and instrumental rehearsal rooms, and more than 100 offices and studios. Its faculty has included such notable names as Eileen Farrell, David Effron, Arthur Fagen, János Starker, Costanz Cuccaro, Timothy Noble, André Watts, Menahem Pressler, Carol Ann Weaver, Linda Strommen, Abbey Simon, Jorge Bolet, Ray Cramer, David Baker, William Bell, Harvey Phillips, Earl Bates, Carol Vaness, Sylvia McNair, Howard Klug, violinist Joshua Bell, conductor Leonard Slatkin, and composer Sven-David Sandström. Notable alumni include Edgar Meyer and soprano Angela Brown. Many alumni have gone on to win Grammys and other music awards.

Kelley School of Business

The Kelley School of Business (known colloquially as "Kelley" or "The B-School") was founded in 1920 as the university's School of Commerce and Finance. Approximately 6,100 students are enrolled in undergraduate, graduate Accountancy and Information Systems degrees, MBA and PhD programs, and in its online degree program, "Kelley Direct".

In its 2017 rankings, U.S. News & World Report ranked the undergraduate program tied for 9th in the nation and the MBA program tied for 21st in the U.S., with the online MBA program ranking 3rd.

Business Week ranked the undergraduate program 8th in 2014 (3rd among public schools) and the graduate program 15th in the nation in 2008 and fourth among public schools. Also, Business Week gave the undergraduate program an A in teaching and an A+ in career services. In 2016, Business Week ranked the undergraduate program 4th in the nation, #1 among public universities. The 2016 ranking for "Best Undergraduate Business Schools" by Poets & Quants ranked the Kelley School of Business 7th in the nation and 2nd among public schools.

In its 2012 rankings, Poets & Quants also ranked Kelley's MBA program 5th in the nation in producing six Fortune 500 CEOs. In 2017, the Economist ranked the MBA program 17th in the nation, and 22nd in the world. It was ranked 7th in terms of percentage increase from pre-MBA salary.

Kelley partners with the Scotts Miracle-Gro Company to offer Bloomington Brands, a unique work-study program for undergraduates and MBA students. Participating students obtain real-world brand management experience by managing the Osmocote Plant Food brand under contract to Scotts. Kelley also partners with Coca-Cola for a program called Global Business Institute that is available in the Middle East, North Africa, and Asia. This is a program that was designed to let select groups of students in participating countries learn about business from the context of American culture.

Maurer School of Law

The Maurer School of Law, founded in 1842, is one of the oldest schools on the Bloomington campus. It features a law library recently ranked first in the nation and is situated on the southwest corner of campus. In 2000, then-Chief Justice William Rehnquist presided over a mock trial of King Henry VIII in the school's moot courtroom. In the 2016 U.S. News & World Report rankings, the school was ranked tied for 25th in the nation among law schools. Notable alumni from the School of Law include songwriter Hoagy Carmichael, and vice-chairman of the 9/11 Commission and former congressman Lee H. Hamilton.
On December 4, 2008, the school of law was renamed the Michael Maurer School of Law.

School of Education

The School of Education, formerly a part of the College of Arts and Science, has been independent since 1923. One of the largest schools of education in the United States, it was ranked 25th in the nation by U.S. News & World Report in its 2016 rankings. It offers a range of degrees in professional education: a BS in teacher education leading to a teaching license, MS., education specialist (EdS) and doctoral (EdD, PhD) degrees.

Luddy School of Informatics, Computing, and Engineering

In 1999, the Indiana University School of Informatics was established as an environment for research professors and students to develop new uses for information technology to solve specific problems in areas as diverse as biology, fine arts, and economics. This was the first school of Informatics established in the United States. Informatics is also interested in "how people transform technology, and how technology transforms us." In 2005 the Department of Computer Science moved from the College of Arts and Sciences to the School of Informatics, prompting the school to expand its name to "School of Informatics and Computing". This move merged several faculty, bringing the total core faculty to over 100. In 2015, Indiana University submitted a proposal to the Indiana Commission for Higher Education for the establishment of an Engineering program. Purdue University attempted to block the proposal, but the commission shot them down, passing the proposal unanimously. Following approval, in 2016 the new Department of Intelligent Systems Engineering was established as a part of the School of Informatics and Computing, and its name was again changed, this time to the "School of Informatics, Computing, and Engineering," commonly referred to as SICE. Shortly after, IU approved the construction of a $39.8 million new facility to house the rechristened school, named Luddy Hall, after alumnus, Fred Luddy. Luddy Hall opened its doors in January 2018. Informatics also has strong ties with the Media School, Jacobs School of Music, and the Cognitive Science program.

The School is one of a handful that offers degrees in Human-Computer Interaction. The School offers master's degrees in Human-Computer Interaction Design, Music Informatics, Bioinformatics, Chemical Informatics, Security Informatics, Intelligent Systems Engineering, Computer Science, and PhD degrees in Computer Science, Informatics, and Intelligent Systems Engineering. Specialization areas for the PhD in Computer Science include artificial intelligence, databases, distributed systems, formal methods, high-performance computing, programming languages, and security. The Informatics PhD program offers tracks in bioinformatics, cheminformatics, complex systems, human-computer interaction design, logic and mathematical foundations of informatics, music informatics, security informatics, and social informatics.

The School has four departments, namely, Informatics, Intelligent Systems Engineering, Computer Science, and Information and Library Science. The IU Department of Information and Library Science (ILS) was ranked by U.S. News & World Report in 2016 as the 8th best program in the nation. It has also been ranked number 1 in scholarly productivity by a 2006 study published in the journal Library & Information Science Research. ILS is housed on the ground floor of the Wells Library's Western Tower. In April 2012, what was formerly known as the School of Library and Information Science and IU's School of Informatics and Computing began a discussion on a possible merger of the two schools. Indiana University Board of Trustees approved the merger on October 22, 2012. Effective from July 1, 2013, IU School of Informatics and School of Library and Information and Science will merge into a single school to be called the IU School of Informatics and Computing.

O'Neill School of Public and Environmental Affairs

The O'Neill School of Public and Environmental Affairs (or SPEA) is the largest school of its kind in the United States. Founded in 1972, SPEA is known for its distinctive interdisciplinary approach. It brings together the social, natural, behavioral, and administrative sciences in one faculty. SPEA has a sister "core" campus at Indiana University-Purdue University Indianapolis (or IUPUI) and an affiliate program is operated at Indiana University's Gary campus.

In their 2016 rankings, U.S. News & World Report rated SPEA ranked tied for first in the nation, with five of its programs ranked in the top 10: environmental policy and management 1st, nonprofit management and leadership 1st, public finance and budgeting 1st, public management administration 3rd, and public policy analysis 7th. Similar rankings do not yet exist for graduate schools of environmental science or undergraduate schools in either public affairs or environmental science. According to the 2020 Shanghai Global Academic Ranking of Subjects, SPEA is the second most highly ranked institution in the world for public administration. Also in 2020, U.S. News & World Report ranked SPEA's MPA program #1 in the country.

SPEA is the headquarters of the Public Administration Review, the premier journal of public administration research, theory, and practice. SPEA is also home to the Journal of Policy Analysis and Management, the Journal of Public Budgeting and Finance and Small Business Economics.

SPEA has more than a dozen joint programs in social and natural sciences and professional fields. Popular majors include nonprofit management and leadership, public policy, public finance, and arts administration. SPEA alumni include radio and television host Tavis Smiley and former U.S. Treasury Secretary Paul O'Neill. Among SPEA's faculty was Elinor Ostrom, the first woman to receive the Nobel Prize in Economics. She was named by Time Magazine one of the 100 most influential people in the United States.

School of Public Health-Bloomington

Established in 2012 the school and programs have grown to encompass a broad spectrum of academic interests and professional fields. The school was founded in 1946 as the School of Health, Physical Education, and Recreation. It transitioned into the School of Public Health-Bloomington and was renamed in September 2012. It was accredited by the Council on Education in Public Health in June 2015.

The school has nearly 3,000 students and 24,000 living alumni, with undergraduate and advanced degree programs offered through five academic departments: Applied Health Science, Environmental Health, Epidemiology & Biostatistics, Kinesiology, and Recreation, Park, & Tourism Studies. The Division of Campus Recreational Sports within the IU School of Public Health-Bloomington provides sport and fitness opportunities for the IU community and the public.

The school has numerous centers, institutes, and specialized laboratories, including the Center for Sexual Health Promotion, the Indiana Prevention Resource Center, the National Center on Accessibility, the Rural Center for AIDS/STD Prevention, among others.

School of Social Work
The Indiana University School of Social Work was founded in 1911 as the Department of Social Service, thus making it the oldest professional social work education program begun and still functioning as a part of a university. In July 2007, the Indiana University Division of Labor Studies merged with the School of Social Work.

Department of Labor Studies: the Department of Labor Studies, a unit housed within the School of Social Work, was founded in the 1940s during the tenure of Herman B Wells in response to the growing role of organized labor in American society. Today, the Division is one of only several degree-granting programs in the nation for the area of labor studies or industrial relations. Notable faculty in recent years have included Leonard Page, General Counsel for the National Labor Relations Board during the Clinton Administration, and labor economist/author Michael Yates.

School of Medicine

School of Nursing

The Indiana University Training School for Nurses was established in Indianapolis in 1914 in conjunction with the establishment of the Robert W. Long Hospital and in association with the IU School of Medicine to offer training leading to a nursing diploma. It was renamed the IU School of Nursing in 1956.
In the 1930s a Division of Nursing Education under the IU School of Education was created on the Bloomington campus to offer additional training to nursing students seeking BS; an MS degree program was added in 1945. Today, the School of Nursing is located at several of the IU campuses, with Indianapolis and Bloomington being the main locations.  its degree programs include a four-year Bachelor of Science in Nursing (BSN) degree, a Master of Science in Nursing (MSN) degree, and two doctoral degrees: Doctor of Nursing Practice (DNP) and Doctor of Philosophy in nursing (PhD).

The National League for Nursing has recognized the School as a Center of Excellence in two categories simultaneously for creating environments that: Promote the Pedagogical Expertise of Faculty and Creating Environments (effective 2006–22) and Advance the Science of Nursing Education (effective 2012–21). The IU School of Nursing ranks eighth among public universities who receive funding from the National Institutes of Health. Almost forty percent of the baccalaureate-prepared professional nurses in Indiana graduate from the IU School of Nursing each year. In 2017 the U.S. News & World Report ranked the IU School of Nursing twenty-eighth for its master's degree program and twenty-third for its Doctor of Nursing Practice degree among U.S. colleges and universities; its online graduate program ranked thirty-ninth.

School of Optometry

The Indiana University School of Optometry was founded in 1951. The school became a degree-granting institution of its own in 1975. Located at the southwest border of campus the Doctor of Optometry (OD) program admits on average 70–80 students per year.

The school operates a  community eye care clinic in Bloomington and a clinic in Indianapolis. In addition to providing optometric education, the facility also houses the Borish Center for Ophthalmic Research, officially dedicated in October 1995. The Borish Center provides opportunities for undergraduate, professional, and graduate students to participate directly in vision research.

University Graduate School
In 2007–08, the Graduate and Professional Student Organization partnered with the Graduate to create the Emissaries for Graduate Student Diversity. Emissaries work either towards outreach and enrollment or retention and community building. Outreach and enrollment emissaries inform prospective students about opportunities at IU. They also help them navigate the admissions process. The retention and community building Emissaries act as mentors for current students. The Graduate School has a separate student government (Graduate and Professional Student Government, or GPSG). They collaborate with faculty to help improve the quality of services offered to graduate students attending Indiana University.

Athletics

IU's intercollegiate athletics program has a long tradition in several key sports. From its beginnings with baseball in 1867, the Hoosier athletic program has grown to include over 600 male and female student-athletes on 24 varsity teams boasting one of the nation's best overall records. Sports sponsored by the university include football, men's basketball, women's basketball, cross country and track, softball, baseball, golf, tennis, rowing, volleyball, swimming and diving, and wrestling.

The Hoosiers became a member of the Big Ten Conference on December 1, 1899. The school's national affiliation is with the National Collegiate Athletic Association (NCAA). National team titles (now totaling 26; 25 NCAA, 1 AIAW) have been won in nine men's sports and one women's sport (tennis), topped by a record-setting six straight men's swimming & diving titles, eight men's soccer crowns and five titles in men's basketball. Indiana University's men's basketball team is one of the most decorated programs in the nation, having won five national championships. Indiana student-athletes have won 133 NCAA individual titles, including 79 in men's swimming and diving and 31 in men's track and field. Also, IU teams have won or shared 157 Big Ten Conference championships.

The IU athletics endowment is $42 million, the largest in the Big Ten. The Varsity Club, which is the fundraising arm of the Athletics Department, drew a record $11.5 million in gifts and pledges in fiscal year 2004–05. Also, overall annual giving has increased by 8.3 percent in the last year and 44.8 percent in the last three years.

In addition to its tradition in intervarsity sports, IU also has many non-varsity sports. Hurling has also become more popular, with the Indiana University Hurling Club becoming the first American national champions in history.

A large percentage of the IU student body regularly participates in both formal and/or informal intramural sports, including football, soccer, tennis, basketball, and golf.

Media

Media outlets of Indiana University include:
 WFIU radio – a charter member of the National Public Radio network, WFIU is a public radio station operating out of the Radio and TV Center on the Bloomington, Indiana Campus. Licensed to the Trustees of Indiana University, it is funded by several sources: Indiana University; the Corporation for Public Broadcasting; program underwriting grants from community businesses and organizations; and voluntary contributions from listeners. Programming centers on classical music, national and international news. Other formats include folk music, jazz, comedy, and news & public affairs programming.
 WTIU television – a 24-hour public television licensed to Indiana University, operating out of the Radio and TV Center on the Bloomington, Indiana campus. WTIU is a PBS affiliate and carries national and locally produced programming, serving over 20 counties in west and south-central Indiana, including the cities of Bloomington, Bedford, Columbus, and Terre Haute, and the communities of Martinsville, Linton, Bloomfield, Nashville, Spencer, and Seymour. Approximately 175,000 TV households are included in the viewing area, cable and off-air combined.
 IUSTV (Indiana University Student television station) – an entirely student-run television station broadcasting to over 12,000 on-campus residents and over 40,000 Bloomington residents via Public-access television. Founded in 2002, IUSTV has quickly grown to be a leading media entity and student organization on campus.
 Indiana Daily Student – free daily newspaper fully supported financially through ad sales. Founded in 1867, it has a circulation of over 15,000 and is produced by IU students.
 WIUX – an entirely student-run radio station that broadcasts currently on FM 99.1 and via live internet streaming on its website. It broadcasts 24 hours a day, 7 days a week during the fall and spring semesters. Besides playing independent music, the station provides coverage of nine different Indiana University sports teams. The station was established in 1963 under the call letters WQAD. It was granted a low-power FM license in the spring of 2005 and transitioned to FM in early 2006.

Faculty
With over 1,823 full-time faculty members, Indiana University leads the Big Ten public universities in the number of endowed faculty positions, with 333 chairs, professorships, and curators. IUB also reported in fall 2004 that it employed 334 part-time faculty, totaling 1,877 full-time equivalents. Of the full-time faculty, 76% were tenured. Like the student body, IUB's faculty is predominantly white. Of full-time administrators, faculty, and lecturers, 118 (6%) were Asian, 74 (4%) were African-American, 62 (4%) were Hispanic, 5 (0.3%) were Native American, and 1,535 (85%) were "other." More men (62%) than women held academic appointments at the university.

Enrollment statistics

Notable faculty and alumni 

Notable current faculty include cognitive scientist Douglas Hofstadter, violinist Joshua Bell, and pianist André Watts. Notable Indiana alumni include James Watson, one of the co-discoverers of the structure of DNA; Jimmy Wales, the co-founder of Wikipedia; Robert Gates, the 22nd United States Secretary of Defense; former CEO of Disney, Bob Chapek; Jeri Taylor, screenwriter and co-creator of Star Trek: Voyager; award-winning author Suzanne Collins, who wrote The Hunger Games series; composer and songwriter Hoagy Carmichael; John Chambers, former CEO of Cisco Systems; Bollywood actor Ranveer Singh; mathematician Max August Zorn; sexologist Alfred Kinsey; and poet Yusef Komunyakaa; and billionaire investor Mark Cuban.

Sustainability
IU Bloomington's Von Lee Theatre building is LEED Certified. The "More Art, Less Trash" recycling initiative included a design contest for recycling bin artwork and promotes both recycling and outdoor art. The university employs a group of student sustainability interns each summer, and students can get involved in campus and community-based sustainability initiatives through the Volunteers in Sustainability coordination group or the Student Sustainability Council. IU launched its Environmental Resiliency Institute in 2017 to enable more efficient collaboration between the university, local communities, and businesses on greenhouse gas reduction and sustainability projects. Cities that have participated in the program include Bloomington, Fort Wayne, Gary, West Lafayette, and Zionsville among others.

Transportation
A campus bus system operates several routes on a regular schedule around the IUB campus throughout the semesters. In December 2014, a shuttle service ("Campus Connection") has been introduced between the IUB and the IUPUI campus as well. In March 2020 this Campus Commute service was discontinued. The campus buses are free to all IU affiliates and are handicap accessible. IU students and employees also gain free access to Bloomington transit buses around the city.

Notes

References

Further reading
 Capshew, James H. Herman B Wells: The Promise of the American University (Indiana University Press, 2012) 460 pp excerpt and text search
 Clark, Thomas D. Indiana University, Midwest Pioneer, Volume I: The Early Years (1970)
 Clark, Thomas D. Indiana University: Midwestern Pioneer, Vol II: In Mid-Pasage (1973)
 Clark, Thomas D. Indiana University: Midwestern Pioneer: Volume III: Years of Fulfillment (1977) covers 1938–68
 Gros Louis, Kenneth. "Herman B Wells and the Legacy of Leadership at Indiana University," Indiana Magazine of History (2007) 103#3 pp 290–301. online

Primary sources
 Wells, Herman B. Being Lucky: Reminiscences and Reflections (1980) excerpt and text search

External links

 
 Indiana University Athletics website
 

 
Historic districts on the National Register of Historic Places in Indiana
University and college buildings on the National Register of Historic Places in Indiana
Buildings and structures in Bloomington, Indiana
Public universities and colleges in Indiana
Educational institutions established in 1820
Tourist attractions in Bloomington, Indiana
Flagship universities in the United States
1820 establishments in Indiana
National Register of Historic Places in Monroe County, Indiana
Bloomington
Universities and colleges accredited by the Higher Learning Commission